The Hunter 270 is an American sailboat that was designed for cruising and first built in 2000.

Production
The design was built by Hunter Marine in the United States, but it is now out of production.

Design
The Hunter 270 is a recreational keelboat, built predominantly of fiberglass. It has a fractional sloop rig with a full-batten mainsail , a nearly plumb stem, a walk-through reverse transom, a transom-hung rudder controlled by a wheel and a fixed wing keel. It displaces .

Standard equipment supplied included masthead anchor lights, an enclosed head, teak and holly cabin sole, a butane stove, kitchen dishes, portable cooler, anchor, stainless steel boarding ladder and life jackets. Factory optional equipment included a Bimini top, road trailer, roller furler, spinnaker and a marine VHF radio.

The design has a PHRF racing average handicap of 222 with a high of 234 and low of 215.

See also
List of sailing boat types

Similar sailboats
Beneteau First 26
Beneteau First 265
C&C 26
C&C 26 Wave
Contessa 26
Dawson 26
Discovery 7.9
Grampian 26
Herreshoff H-26
Hunter 26
Hunter 26.5
Hunter 260
MacGregor 26
Mirage 26
Nash 26
Nonsuch 26
Outlaw 26
Paceship PY 26
Parker Dawson 26
Pearson 26
Sandstream 26
Tanzer 26
Yamaha 26

References

External links
Official brochure

Keelboats
2000s sailboat type designs
Sailing yachts
Sailboat types built by Hunter Marine